ISO 3166-2:BQ is the entry for Bonaire, Sint Eustatius and Saba in ISO 3166-2, part of the ISO 3166 standard published by the International Organization for Standardization (ISO), which defines codes for the names of the principal subdivisions (e.g., provinces or states) of all countries coded in ISO 3166-1.

Currently for Bonaire, Sint Eustatius and Saba, special municipalities of the Netherlands, ISO 3166-2 codes are defined for 3 special municipalities.

Each code consists of two parts, separated by a hyphen. The second part is two letters.

Each special municipality is also assigned their own ISO 3166-2 code under the entry for the Netherlands.

Current codes
Subdivision names are listed as in the ISO 3166-2 standard published by the ISO 3166 Maintenance Agency (ISO 3166/MA).

Click on the button in the header to sort each column.

Changes
The following changes to the entry had been announced in newsletters by the ISO 3166/MA since the first publication of ISO 3166-2 in 1998:

References

External links
 ISO Online Browsing Platform: BQ
 Caribbean Netherlands, Statoids.com

2:BQ
Dutch Caribbean